Himrod Baptist Church, also known as First Baptist Church of Milo, is a historic Baptist church located at Milo in Yates County, New York. It is a Greek Revival style structure built about 1833.

It was listed on the National Register of Historic Places in 1994.

References

Churches on the National Register of Historic Places in New York (state)
Baptist churches in New York (state)
Churches completed in 1833
19th-century Baptist churches in the United States
Churches in Yates County, New York
National Register of Historic Places in Yates County, New York